United Nations Security Council Resolution 368, adopted on April 17, 1975, recalled previous resolutions and considered a report from the Secretary-General before calling upon the parties involved in the prevailing state of tension in the aftermath of the Yom Kippur War to immediately implement resolution 338.  The Council then renewed the mandate of the United Nations Emergency Force for another three months until July 24, 1975, and requested the Secretary-General submit a report on the developments in the situation and the measures taken to implement the resolution.

The resolution was adopted by 13 votes; China and Iraq did not participate in the vote.

See also
 Arab–Israeli conflict
 Egypt–Israel relations
 List of United Nations Security Council Resolutions 301 to 400 (1971–1976)
 Yom Kippur War

References
Text of the Resolution at undocs.org

External links
 

 0368
Arab–Israeli peace process
Yom Kippur War
April 1975 events